Adam Hubble (born 25 March 1986) was an Australian professional tennis player playing on the ITF Men's Circuit and the ATP Challenger Tour who specialized in doubles. On 30 November 2009, he reached his highest ATP singles ranking of 679 whilst his best doubles ranking was 146 on 2 August 2010. He was best known for multiple tournament wins with fellow Australian player Kaden Hensel. Hubble briefly played NCAA div I tennis for the University of Tennessee before turning semi professional. His last professional singles tournament was in Burnie, Australia in February 2015 and last professional doubles tournament was in Liberec, Czech Republic in August 2015. His playing style relied on a big serve, soft hands, high percentage returns and an elite level of fitness. Adam Hubble is now the Head Coach at Grace Park Hawthorn Club in Hawthorn Australia. He is a distant relation to famed astronomer Edwin Hubble. Adam Hubble is currently dating Australian tennis player Miranda Poile.

Career finals

Doubles finals: 7 (2–5)

References

External links

Grace Park Hawthorn Club

1986 births
Living people
Australian male tennis players
Place of birth missing (living people)
Tennessee Volunteers men's tennis players
21st-century Australian people